Rachel Todd Wetzsteon (November 25, 1967 – December 24/25?, 2009) was an American poet.

Life
Born in New York City, New York, the daughter of editor and critic Ross Wetzsteon, she graduated from Yale University in 1989 where she studied with Marie Borroff and John Hollander.
She graduated from Johns Hopkins University with an MA, and from Columbia University with a Ph.D. She taught at Barnard College.

She lived in Manhattan and went on to teach at William Paterson University and the Unterberg Poetry Center of the Ninety-Second Street Y.

Her work appeared in many publications including The New Yorker, The Paris Review, The New Republic, The Nation, and The Village Voice. 
She was poetry editor of The New Republic.

Wetzsteon committed suicide on Dec. 24 or early on the 25th, 2009. Since 2010, a writing prize has been offered in her memory in the Columbia University English Department. Since 2014, the William Paterson University English Department's in-house literary journal, Map Literary, has produced The Rachel Wetzsteon Chapbook Award  every two years.

Awards
 2001 Witter Bynner Poetry Prize from the American Academy of Arts and Letters
 Ingram Merrill grant
 1993 National Poetry Series, for Other Stars

Works
 "Gold Leaves"; "Five-Finger Exercise", THE CORTLAND REVIEW, ISSUE 32, June 2006
 "At the Zen Mountain Monastery", Very Like a Whale, September 7, 2006 
 
 "Manhattan Triptych"; "Sakura Park", Poetry Daily

Poetry
 The Other Stars (Penguin, 1994) 
 Home and Away (Penguin, 1998) 
 Sakura Park (Persea, 2006) 
 Silver Roses  (Persea, 2010)

Anthologies
 Mark Jarman and David Mason, eds. (1996). Rebel Angels: 25 Poets of the New Formalism. Story Line Press. 
 Gerald Costanzo and Jim Daniels, eds. (2000). American Poetry: The Next Generation. Carnegie Mellon University Press.

Criticism
 
 "Rachel Wetzsteon on Auden", NEWSLETTER 21, The W. H. Auden Society, February 2001
    (reprint CRC Press, 2007)
 
 "Marvellous Sapphics", Poetry Society: "Crossroads", Fall 1999

Editor
 Virginia Woolf, Night and Day (Barnes and Noble Classics, 2005)

References

External links
"Rachel Wetzsteon, Poet of Keen Insights and Wit, Dies at 42", New York Times, December 31, 2009
"Rachel Wetzsteon, poet mixed melancholy, wit", Boston Globe, January 2, 2010
"E-Verse is deeply saddened by the death of the poet Rachel Wetzsteon", E-Verse Radio
"Rachel Wetzsteon dead", Eratosphere
"Remembering Rachel Wetzsteon", The Best American Poetry, January 8, 2010
"Home and Away." The Paris Review sessions, Issue 143, Summer 1997

William Paterson University faculty
1967 births
2009 suicides
Yale University alumni
Barnard College faculty
Johns Hopkins University alumni
Columbia University alumni
American women poets
20th-century American poets
20th-century American women writers
The New Republic people
The Village Voice people
American women academics
2009 deaths
21st-century American women
Suicides in New York City
Female suicides